An ideogram or ideograph (from Greek   "idea" and   "to write") is a graphic symbol that represents an idea or concept, independent of any particular language, and specific words or phrases.  Some ideograms are comprehensible only by familiarity with prior convention; others convey their meaning through pictorial resemblance to a physical object, and thus may also be referred to as pictograms.

The numerals and mathematical symbols are ideograms – 1 'one', 2 'two', + 'plus', = 'equals', and so on (compare the section "Mathematics" below). In English, the ampersand & is used for 'and' and (as in many languages) for Latin  (as in &c for ), % for 'percent' ('per cent'), # for 'number' (or 'pound', among other meanings), § for 'section', $ for 'dollar', € for 'euro', £ for 'pound', ° for 'degree', @ for 'at', and so on. The reason they are ideograms rather than logograms is that they do not denote fixed morphemes: they can be read in many different languages, not just English. There is not always only a single way to read them and they are in some cases read as a complex phrase rather than a single word.

Terminology

In proto-writing, used for inventories and the like, physical objects are represented by stylized or conventionalized pictures, or pictograms. For example, the pictorial Dongba symbols without Geba annotation cannot represent the Naxi language, but are used as a mnemonic for reciting oral literature.
Some systems also use ideograms, symbols denoting abstract concepts.

The term "ideogram" is often used to describe symbols of writing systems such as Egyptian hieroglyphs, Sumerian cuneiform and Chinese characters.  However, these symbols represent elements of a particular language, mostly words or morphemes (so that they are logograms), rather than objects or concepts. In these writing systems, a variety of strategies were employed in the design of logographic symbols.
Pictographic symbols depict the object referred to by the word, such as an icon of a bull denoting the Semitic word ʾālep "ox".
Some words denoting abstract concepts may be represented iconically, but most other words are represented using the rebus principle, borrowing a symbol for a similarly-sounding word. Later systems used selected symbols to represent the sounds of the language, for example the adaptation of the logogram for ʾālep "ox" as the letter aleph representing the initial sound of the word, a glottal stop.

Many signs in hieroglyphic as well as in cuneiform writing could be used either logographically or phonetically. For example, the Sumerian sign DIĜIR could represent the word diĝir 'deity', the god An or the word an 'sky'. The Akkadian counterpart  could represent the Akkadian stem il- 'deity', the Akkadian word  šamu 'sky', or the syllable an.

Although Chinese characters are logograms, two of the smaller classes in the traditional classification are ideographic in origin:
 Simple ideographs (指事字 zhǐshìzì) are abstract symbols such as 上 shàng "up" and 下 xià "down" or numerals such as 三 sān "three".
 Semantic compounds (会意字 huìyìzì) are semantic combinations of characters, such as 明 míng "bright", composed of 日 rì "sun" and 月 yuè "moon", or 休 xiū "rest", composed of 人 rén "person" and 木 mù "tree".  In the light of the modern understanding of Old Chinese phonology, researchers now believe that most of the characters originally classified as semantic compounds have an at least partially phonetic nature.

An example of ideograms is the collection of 50 signs developed in the 1970s by the  American Institute of Graphic Arts at the request of the US Department of Transportation. The system was initially used to mark airports and gradually became more widespread.

Mathematics

Mathematical symbols are a type of ideogram.

Proposed universal languages

Inspired by inaccurate early descriptions of Chinese and Japanese characters as ideograms, many Western thinkers have sought to design universal written languages, in which symbols denote concepts rather than words. An early proposal was An Essay towards a Real Character, and a Philosophical Language (1668) by John Wilkins. A recent example is the system of Blissymbols, which was devised by Charles K. Bliss in 1949 and currently includes over 2,000 symbols.

See also

 Character (computing)
 Character (symbol)
 Emoji
 Epigraphy, the study of inscriptions, or epigraphs, including ideographic inscriptions
 Heterogram (linguistics)
 Icon (computing)
 Lexigrams
 List of symbols
 List of writing systems (including a sublist of ideographic systems)
 Logotype
Segmental script (a script that has a grapheme for each phoneme)
 Therblig
 Traffic sign

References

DeFrancis, John. 1990. The Chinese Language: Fact and Fantasy. Honolulu: University of Hawaii Press. 
Hannas, William. C. 1997. Asia's Orthographic Dilemma. University of Hawaii Press.  (paperback);  (hardcover)
Unger, J. Marshall. 2003. Ideogram: Chinese Characters and the Myth of Disembodied Meaning.  (trade paperback),  (hardcover)

External links
The Ideographic Myth Extract from DeFrancis' book.
American Heritage Dictionary definition
Ideogram at Merriam-Webster OnLine

Communication design
Graphic design
Pictograms
Writing systems